Illinois Route 56 (IL 56) is a  east–west state highway in northern and northeastern Illinois. It runs from the interchange of Illinois Route 47 at U.S. Route 30 (US 30) in Sugar Grove east to US 12/US 20/US 45 (Mannheim Road) by Bellwood.

Route description 

Illinois 56 parallels Interstate 88 (Ronald Reagan Memorial Tollway) for its entire length and merges with it at Illinois Route 31. This state route running along a tolled freeway makes it one of only three state roads (the other being IL 110 and IL 390) to require tolls. Travelling eastbound, it begins at US 30 in Sugar Grove just west of Orchard Road and then runs with the I-88 tollway until intersecting Illinois Route 31. The route travels north with IL 31 briefly, then crosses over the Fox River. From there, the route heads in a northeasterly direction, paralleling I-88 to the north. The route ends at US 12/US 20/US 45.

Route 56 is called Butterfield Road for its entire length east of Illinois Route 25 until it meets its end as Washington Boulevard in Bellwood. It serves the Chicago suburbs of Aurora, Downers Grove, Elmhurst, Oak Brook, Wheaton, and other communities, as well as the College of DuPage,  Oakbrook Center shopping mall, and farther out, the Fermilab in Batavia. Butterfield Road is a major arterial road within the Illinois Technology and Research Corridor.

History 
SBI Route 56 was the current Illinois 56 from Oak Brook to Bellwood on Butterfield Road. On April 2, 1965, the Illinois State Division of Highways announced that the IL 56 designation over IL 55 west of 22nd Street, which was duplicated by the designation of Interstate 55. The rest of IL 55 was removed east to Ogden Avenue via Cermak Road. In 1972, the eastern end was truncated to its current location. The western end of Illinois 56 is part of the old alignment of the old East–West Tollway.

Major intersections

See also
Cermak Road

References

External links

 Illinois Highway Ends: Illinois Route 56

056
Transportation in Kane County, Illinois
Transportation in DuPage County, Illinois
Transportation in Cook County, Illinois